Hisako Mukai  (born ) is a retired Japanese female volleyball player, who played as a wing spiker. She was part of the Japan women's national volleyball team at the 2002 FIVB Volleyball Women's World Championship in Germany, and at the 2002 Asian Games. On club level she played with Toray Arrows.

Clubs
 Toray Arrows (2002)

References

External links
www.fivb
www.fivb
www.fivb

1978 births
Living people
Japanese women's volleyball players
Place of birth missing (living people)
Volleyball players at the 2002 Asian Games
Asian Games medalists in volleyball
Asian Games bronze medalists for Japan
Medalists at the 2002 Asian Games